A Twenty20 International (T20I) is an international cricket match between two teams, each having T20I status, as determined by the International Cricket Council, the sport's world governing body. In a T20I, the two teams play a single innings each, which is restricted to a maximum of 20 overs. The format was originally introduced by the England and Wales Cricket Board for the county cricket competition with the first matches contested on 13 June 2003 between the English counties in the Twenty20 Cup. The first T20I took place on 17 February 2005 when Australia defeated New Zealand by 44 runs at Eden Park in Auckland.

A five-wicket haul (also known as a "five-for" or "fifer") refers to a bowler taking five or more wickets in a single innings. This is regarded as a notable achievement, especially in the Twenty20 format, as bowlers can bowl no more than four overs in an innings. The first five-wicket haul in a T20I match was taken by Pakistan's Umar Gul while playing against New Zealand at The Oval during the 2009 ICC World Twenty20. The best bowling figures in an T20I innings was taken by Nigeria's Peter Aho who returned figures of 6 for 5 against Sierra Leone. 11 players have taken five-wicket haul twice.

Five bowlers have taken a five-wicket haul on T20I debut. Tanzania's Yalinde Nkanya has taken the most economical five-wicket haul with an economy rate of just 0.50. He ended with the figures of 5/2 in 4 overs. The least economical five-wicket haul was taken by Joshua Rasu of Vanuatu with an economy rate of 12.70. He ended with the figures of 5/36 in 2.5 overs. Tomakanute Ritawa of Cook Islands is oldest player to take five wickets in an T20I innings, achieving the feat at the age of 46 years, while Samuel Conteh of Sierra Leone, is the youngest at 18 years.  

, 108 five-wicket hauls have been taken by 97 different players from over 2,000 T20I matches. South Africa lead the list with 8 five-wicket hauls.

Key

Five-wicket hauls

Notes

References

Twenty20 International
Five-wicket hauls